Deck The Hall Ball is an annual holiday-themed concert run by Seattle radio station 107.7 The End KNDD-FM. It takes place in mid-December and has been held in a number of different venues in the Seattle area.

Notes
In 2001, KNDD split Deck into two nights, the first of which was an all-electric "Plugged In" show, with the following night's bands playing unplugged acoustic sets.

In past years KNDD has streamed the entire concert live on its website 1077TheEnd.com.

Line-ups

References

External links
1077TheEnd.com
1077TheEnd.com/Deck
1077TheEnd.com
KNDD-FM Public File

Culture of Seattle